Catton Grove Chalk Pit is a  geological Site of Special Scientific Interest on the northern outskirts of Norwich in Norfolk. It is a Geological Conservation Review site.

This Cretaceous site exposes rocks dating to the late Campanian, around 75 million years ago, and it is the type site for the Catton Sponge Bed. Its well preserved fossils include many undescribed sponges and important ammonites.

The site is private land with no public access.

References

Sites of Special Scientific Interest in Norfolk
Geological Conservation Review sites